Felicena dora is a butterfly of the family Hesperiidae. It is found in New Guinea.

External links
Insects of Papua New Guinea

Trapezitinae
Butterflies described in 1949